Konuma Katsuyuki (born 14 August 1955 as Katsuyuki Konuma) is a former sumo wrestler from Kasukabe, Saitama, Japan. He made his professional debut in July 1971, and reached the top division in March 1976. His highest rank was maegashira 9.  He was a contemporary of Chiyonofuji, and the second man after him born in the Shōwa 30s (1955–1964) to reach the top division. He was talked of as a future yokozuna candidate and the "new Kitanoumi" but after breaking his leg in May 1976 his career never recovered. He retired from active competition in November 1978 at the age of just 23, due partly to the effects of his injury but also to a breakdown in relations with his stablemaster Kagamiyama, former yokozuna Kashiwado. After leaving sumo he ran a restaurant in his hometown of Kasukabe. His relationship with Kagamiyama later improved enough for the latter to attend his wedding ceremony.

Career record

See also
Glossary of sumo terms
List of past sumo wrestlers
List of sumo tournament second division champions

References

1955 births
Living people
Japanese sumo wrestlers
Sumo people from Saitama Prefecture
Sumo wrestlers who use their birth name